Erhan Arıklı (born 1962, Ardahan) is a Turkish academic, politician and leader of the Rebirth Party. He participated in the 2020 Turkish Republic of Northern Cyprus presidential election as the candidate of the Rebirth Party. He started to work as the Minister of Public Works and Transport in the UBP+DP+YDP Coalition Government, which was established after the 23 January 2022 elections.

References

Turkish Cypriot academics
1962 births
Living people